The Samuel Risley-class icebreakers are a class of two icebreakers and buoy tenders constructed for and operated by the Canadian Coast Guard. The two ships are based on offshore supply tugboat design and entered service in the 1980s. Samuel Risley is deployed to the Central Region, operating mainly on the Great Lakes of North America, while Earl Grey is posted to Atlantic Canada, working off the east coast of Canada.

Design and description
In the late 1970s, offshore supply tugboats were in high demand and their success led to experimentation by the Canadian Coast Guard. In 1980, a crane was temporarily installed aboard the former offshore supply vessel , situated on the afterdeck. This was done to see if this would be a successful model for buoytending. Jackman visited all the principal coast guard stations in the eastern half of the country to test the setup in different conditions in 1980–81. The results of the test proved positive and in 1983, the Canadian Coast Guard contracted Robert Allen Ltd of Vancouver to create a design based on this setup.

The design of the vessels is based on offshore supply-tugboat designs, with strengthened chines. The vessel has a tall foredeck, and a long low quarterdeck, for carrying buoys, where a crane with a capability of lifting  is permanently mounted. The crane is motion stabilized.

Earl Grey is powered by four Deutz 4SA 9-cylinder diesel-electric engines driving two controllable pitch propellers that create . The ship is equipped with one Caterpillar 3306 emergency generator. Samuel Risley is powered by four Wärtsilä Vasa 16V22 12-cylinder geared diesel-electric engines driving two controllable pitch propellers that create . The ship is equipped with one General Motors 6–71 emergency generator.

The vessels are equipped with two Racal Decca navigational radars using the I band. The vessels each have a complement of 24, with 9 officers and 15 crew.

Ships in class

Operational history

Earl Grey was constructed by Pictou Shipyard Ltd at their yard in Pictou, Nova Scotia with the yard number 218. The vessel was completed on 30 May 1986. The vessel is registered in Ottawa, Ontario and home ported at Charlottetown, Prince Edward Island. Samuel Risley  was built by Vito Steel Boat & Barge Limited at their yard in Delta, British Columbia with the yard number 161 and launched in 1984. The vessel was completed on 4 April 1985. After completion, Samuel Risley sailed to eastern Canada, transiting the Panama Canal and deploying to the Great Lakes. The ship is assigned to the Central Region, based at Parry Sound, Ontario.

Earl Grey took part in fall 1998 in assisting in the recovery of wreckage from the crash of Swissair Flight 111. On 7–8 December 1989, Earl Grey was sent to look for survivors from two cargo vessels that had sank in Cabot Strait. None were found. In 1996, the ship assisted in the recovery and raising of a wrecked oil barge from the sea floor which had been carrying bunker oil that had been salvaged from another sunken ship.

In early 2015, Samuel Risley worked alongside other icebreakers to rescue many commercial ships that had become stuck in the ice on the Great Lakes. Earl Grey underwent a refit beginning in 2015. Samuel Risley underwent a refit in 2016. Samuel Risley deployed to the Arctic Ocean during the 2018 sailing season, taking part in the resupply mission to the United States Air Force base at Thule, Greenland.

References

Citations

Sources

 
 
 

~
 
Auxiliary icebreaker classes
Auxiliary tender classes